Dragnet is a 1987 American buddy cop comedy film directed and co-written by Tom Mankiewicz in his directorial debut. Starring Dan Aykroyd and Tom Hanks, the film is based on the radio and television crime drama of the same name. The screenplay, both a parody of and homage to the long-running television series, was written by Aykroyd, Mankiewicz, and Alan Zweibel. The original music score is by Ira Newborn.

Aykroyd plays Joe Friday (nephew of the original series protagonist) while Hanks plays Pep Streebek, his new partner. Harry Morgan reprises his role from the television series as Bill Gannon, now a captain and Friday and Streebek's boss.

Plot
LAPD Sergeant Joe Friday's nephew and namesake, whose anachronistic views reflect those of his late uncle, is involuntarily assigned a cocky, streetwise new partner, Pep Streebek. Their contrasting styles clash at first, with Friday disapproving of Streebek's attitude, hairstyle, and wardrobe. However, they start to bond while investigating a series of bizarre thefts. One of the stolen items is the entire print run of Bait, a pornographic magazine published by Jerry Caesar. Reverend Jonathan Whirley has been leading a moral crusade against Caesar's business.

The trail leads Friday and Streebek to a cult calling itself P.A.G.A.N. (People Against Goodness and Normalcy), and they focus on member Emil Muzz, who also works as Caesar's limousine driver. Under interrogation, Muzz reveals the time and place of a secret ceremony. Friday and Streebek sneak in, disguised as members, and witness a masked leader using several of the stolen items in a ritual leading up to a virgin sacrifice.

The leader throws the victim, Connie Swail (referred to as "the virgin Connie Swail"), into a pit of water with an anaconda. Friday and Streebek disrupt the ritual, saving Connie and subduing the snake, and report the incident to their boss Captain Bill Gannon. However, when Gannon and Police Commissioner Jane Kirkpatrick (who is running for mayor) visit the site with them the next day, no evidence of the ritual can be found. Kirkpatrick removes Friday and Streebek from the case.

Streebek gets a tip on the whereabouts of a load of chemicals stolen by P.A.G.A.N. that can be used to mass-produce a toxic gas. He and Friday lead a SWAT team to raid the location, which proves to be an ordinary milk factory; the chemicals and gas-making equipment are actually hidden next door. With no further leads to follow, Streebek tags along on a birthday dinner for Friday and his grandmother, and Connie soon joins them at Friday's invitation. During dinner, Connie identifies Whirley (at another table with Gannon and Kirkpatrick) as the P.A.G.A.N. leader (as at the ritual, she came face to face with him and removed his mask). Friday attempts to arrest Whirley, but the corrupt Kirkpatrick, whose mayoral campaign is being secretly bankrolled by Whirley and Caesar, overrules him and relieves him of duty (All crimes of the P.A.G.A.N. cult had been part of Kirkpatrick's campaign, as an elevated crime rate would discredit the current mayor). Gannon takes Friday's badge and gun and orders Streebek to stay away from Whirley.

As Friday takes Connie home, Muzz captures them and takes them to the Griffith Observatory, where Whirley reveals to them his plan to kill Caesar at a reunion party for the models of Bait. He has his men take Connie to his private jet and prepares to kill Friday, but Streebek arrives just in time, having forced Muzz to reveal Friday's whereabouts at gunpoint. Streebek infiltrates Caesar's mansion and disrupts the P.A.G.A.N. plans to release the gas made from the stolen chemicals, just before Whirley sets fire to the stolen magazines to cover his escape. Gannon arrives with SWAT teams and Friday crashes the estate gates with an armored vehicle. Streebek personally arrests Muzz while Friday is thanked for stopping the gas attack by a grateful Caesar. Gannon reinstates Friday and returns his badge so he can pursue Whirley.

At the airport, Whirley meets Kirkpatrick and then abandons her and takes off with Connie as his hostage. The following morning, Friday catches up to him in a police jet and forces him to land. Whirley is convicted on multiple charges and received "43 consecutive 99-year sentences" in the Men's Correctional Institue in Chino (Kirkpatrick's fate is never given, though the exposure of her criminal activity means the end of her career), while Friday continues his partnership with Streebek and begins dating Connie, who is no longer called "the virgin" by Friday.

Cast
 Dan Aykroyd as Sergeant Joe Friday
 Tom Hanks as Detective Pep Streebek
 Christopher Plummer as Reverend Jonathan Whirley
 Harry Morgan as Captain Bill Gannon
 Alexandra Paul as "the Virgin" Connie Swail
 Jack O'Halloran as Emil Muzz
 Elizabeth Ashley as Commissioner Jane Kirkpatrick
 Dabney Coleman as Jerry Caesar
 Kathleen Freeman as Enid Borden
 Bruce Gray as Mayor Peter Parvin
 Lenka Peterson as Granny Mundy
 Julia Jennings as Sylvia Wiss
 Fred Asparagus as Tito Provencal
 Kimberly Foster as Betsy Blees
 D.D. Howard as Officer Robin Gilbert
 Peter Leeds as Roy Grest
 Meg Wyllie as Mrs. Gannon

Production
The script for Dragnet was written by Dan Aykroyd and Alan Zweibel, who had worked together during Aykroyd's tenure on Saturday Night Live. Aykroyd had in fact starred as Friday in a Saturday Night Live parody of Dragnet in 1976. Tom Mankiewicz, best known for his work on Superman and the James Bond series, had a deal at Universal and was brought in to work on the film script with them. Ted Kotcheff was originally attached to direct but did not like the draft the three writers had come up with, so Frank Price at Universal suggested Mankiewicz himself direct. Albert Brooks was offered the role of Pep Streebek, but he turned it down. Aykroyd originally wanted Jim Belushi to play the role of Friday's partner Pep Streebek, but Belushi was unavailable and Tom Hanks was cast instead.

British electronic group Art of Noise produced an update of the series' original theme music for the title credits. They set the Dragnet theme against an electronic breakbeat and added soundbites from the film, such as Friday's trademark lines "This is the city", "Just the facts, ma'am", and "I carry a badge.", timed to the music.

The soundtrack includes an original song called "City of Crime", a rock/hip-hop hybrid collaboration performed by Aykroyd and Hanks with bassist/vocalist Glenn Hughes and guitarist Pat Thrall. The track is played over the film's closing credits and had a promotional music video that featured Aykroyd and Hanks.

Reception
The film received favorable reviews from Roger Ebert and Gene Siskel on their program Siskel and Ebert and the Movies. Siskel praised Aykroyd's performance in particular, going so far as to say he deserved an Academy Award nomination. Ebert extended this praise to the ensemble cast, although he lamented the lack of stylized camera shots from the original television show and criticized the use of contemporary pop music. Siskel concluded that "they didn't have enough confidence in the material that they had to try and hook kids in with some disco thing."

In his written review, Ebert gave the movie three out of four stars, concluding that "it is great for an hour, good for about 25 minutes and then heads doggedly for the Standard 1980s High Tech Hollywood Ending, which means an expensive chase scene and a shootout." He also added that he felt the film would have been more effective in black and white.

The film holds a 50% approval score on Rotten Tomatoes based on 36 reviews with an average rating of 5.2/10. The site's critic consensus reads, "While it's sporadically funny and certainly well-cast, Dragnet is too clumsy and inconsistent to honor its classic source material." On Metacritic, the film received a score of 62 based on 17 reviews, indicating "generally favorable reviews".

Box office
Dragnet performed well at the box office, grossing $57.4 million domestically with an additional $9.3 million internationally, for a total of $66.7 million worldwide.

References

External links

 
 
 
 
 

1987 films
1980s crime comedy films
American buddy cop films
American crime comedy films
American parody films
Dragnet (franchise)
Films based on television series
Films based on radio series
Films directed by Tom Mankiewicz
Films set in Los Angeles
Films shot in Los Angeles
Films with screenplays by Dan Aykroyd
Films with screenplays by Tom Mankiewicz
Films with screenplays by Alan Zweibel
1980s police comedy films
American police detective films
Universal Pictures films
Films scored by Ira Newborn
1980s parody films
1987 directorial debut films
1987 comedy films
1980s English-language films
Films produced by Robert K. Weiss
1980s American films